Viscount Hudson, of Pewsey in the County of Wiltshire, was a title in the Peerage of the United Kingdom. It was created on 5 January 1952 for the Conservative politician Robert Hudson. He was the son of Robert William Hudson and the grandson of soap-flake manufacturer Robert Spear Hudson. The title became extinct on the early death of the first Viscount's son, the second Viscount, in 1963.

Viscounts Hudson (1952)
 Robert Spear Hudson, 1st Viscount Hudson (1886–1957)
 Robert William Hudson, 2nd Viscount Hudson (1924–1963)

References

 Robert Spear Hudson, 1st Viscount Hudson at The Peerage website
 Robert William Hudson, 2nd Viscount Hudson at The Peerage website

Extinct viscountcies in the Peerage of the United Kingdom
Noble titles created in 1952
Noble titles created for UK MPs